Chris Parrish (born 19 January 1979) is an American professional water skier. From 15 May 2005 to 2 June 2013 Parrish held the world record for slalom skiing. During that time he tied his record once and beat it twice. In addition to his world records, Parrish has won nine major championships, and is regarded as one of water skiing's most dominant athletes.

Biography 
Chris Parrish was born in Destin, Florida on 19 January 1979. He began water skiing at the age of 2.
Nicknames: The Tower and The Pickleman

Achievements

References 

1979 births
Living people
Male professional water skiers
American water skiers